Ninaikkaadha Naalillai is a 2001 Indian Tamil-language drama film, directed by A. L. Raja and produced by K. Rajan. The film stars R. Parthiban, Rahman, Devayani, and Kaveri. The film had musical score (soundtrack) by Deva.

Plot
Anbu (R. Parthiban) and Arun (Rahman) are bosom buddies with Anbu being indebted to the wealthy Arun for various reasons. Anbu falls in love with Kavitha (Devayani), whose close friend is Kausalya (Kaveri). Arun soon develops a soft corner for Kausalya, whom he had never seen. Her lofty thoughts expressed in her letters to Kavitha had attracted him to her. Kausalya reads his messages to her sent through Kavita's letters and finds herself reciprocating to Arun's feelings. Arun has a near fatal accident and expresses his last wish to see Kavita. Anbu goes to get her, only to find her killed at the hands of the jealous suitor (Prabhukanth). With no way out, Anbu persuades Kavitha to play Kausalya so that his friend's final wish can be fulfilled. However, Arun comes out of the ordeal miraculously alive, and Kavita finds herself trapped in a situation that causes her much heartburn. How the matter is resolved with both the friends trying to play martyr forms the rest of the story.

Cast

R. Parthiban as Anbu
Rahman as Arun
Devayani as Kavitha
Kaveri as Kausalya
Vadivelu as 'Aana Oona' Townmani
Radha Ravi as Kavitha's father
 K. Rajan as Anbu's father
T. S. B. K. Moulee as Arun's father
Sathyapriya as Arun's mother
Prabhukanth as Kausalya's uncle
M. N. Nambiar as Arun's grandfather 
S. N. Lakshmi as Arun's grandmother
S. S. Chandran as Kavitha's grandfather
Shanmugasundari as Kavitha's grandmother
Shanmugasundaram as Prabhukanth's father 
Crane Manohar as Office Waiter
Bonda Mani as Townmani's henchman
Mayilsamy as Mayilsamy
Ram Saravana as Child artist

Soundtrack
Lyrics written by Kalidasan, Ponniyin Selvan, Viveka, and Tholkappiyan.

Reception

Parthiban depicts impressively the character of the friend who puts friendship above love and suffers the consequences in silence. Devayani brings out the helplessness of the character effectively. Some of Vadivelu's comic escapades can be enjoyed. With the two hero subjects being the order of the day it is not surprising that most of the recently released films, have either a love triangle or friendship & sacrifice as its base.

Ninaikkatha Naalillai has both the love triangle and friendship factors weaved in. Neatly crafted in the first half, the film lags a little in the second, and picks up pace in the closing scenes.

References

External links

2001 films
2000s Tamil-language films